Vettisfossen is one of Norway's tallest waterfalls, and the 284th tallest in the world. It is located in the Jotunheimen mountain range inside the Utladalen Landscape Protection Area in Årdal Municipality in Vestland county, Norway. The waterfall has a single drop of  that is nearly vertical.

Vettisfossen is the tallest free-falling waterfall in Europe and in Norway which consists of only one drop, that is entirely free-falling, is not regulated and flows with a considerable volume.

How to reach 
The waterfall can be accessed by a walking tour of two to three hours from the village of Øvre Årdal up the Utladalen valley. The name of the waterfall comes from the Vetti farm, which is located near the base of the waterfall. The mountain farm Vettismorki is also located nearby, just above the falls.

From Vetti gard the trail to Vettisfossen becomes much more rocky. The trail basically ends there. But if one wants to see Vettisfossen waterfall, one can do it only from the opposite side of Fosselvi river, but under no circumstances should attempts be made to cross the river outside of the absolute lowest flow periods.

Media gallery

See also 

List of waterfalls in Norway
 Fosselvi, the river that begins at Vettisfossen and flows towards the river Utla

References

External links 

 
Årdal
Waterfalls of Vestland
Utladalen